A cramp is a sudden, involuntary muscle contraction, often temporarily painful and paralysing.

Cramp or cramps may also refer to:
 Cramp (heraldry), a hooked device in German heraldry
 The Cramps, a garage punk band
 Cramp & Co., built many schools etc. in Philadelphia in the 20th century
 William Cramp & Sons, built many ships in Philadelphia in the late 19th and early 20th centuries

People

 Charlie Cramp (1876–1933), British trade unionist
 Stanley Cramp (1913–1987), British ornithologist
 Rosemary Cramp (1929– ), British archaeologist
 Isabella Cramp, American voice actress
 Sid Cramp, Australian politician